"A Night to Remember" is a song by American R&B group Shalamar. It was released in 1982 as the second single from their sixth studio album, Friends. The song was written by Nidra Beard of Dynasty, Dana Meyers and Charmaine Sylvers of the Sylvers.

Charts

911 version

English boy band 911 covered "A Night to Remember" (retitled as "Night to Remember") as their debut single and the lead single from their debut album, The Journey (1997). It was released on April 29, 1996, and peaked at number 38 on the UK Singles Chart.

Charts

Release history

Liberty X version

English-Irish pop group Liberty X covered "A Night to Remember" and released it as the second single from their third studio album, X (2005). The single was released in the UK on November 14, 2005, as the official Children in Need 2005 charity single, charting at number six on the UK Singles Chart.

Track listings
UK CD1
 "A Night To Remember" (Radio Edit) - 3:02
 "Everybody Dance" (Radio Edit) - 3:07

UK CD2
 "A Night to Remember" (Full Length Version) - 5:04
 "Everybody Dance" (Full Length Version) - 5:01
 "A Holy Night" (Unplugged Acoustic) - 3:11
 "A Night to Remember" (Video) - 3:02

Charts

Weekly charts

Year-end charts

Release history

Popular culture
The Shalamar recording is also famously associated with the introduction of the Moonwalk dance by Shalamar member Jeffrey Daniel on the UK music show Top of the Pops in June 1982.
In the UK this song has also been used for a television advert featuring the Harvester restaurant chain.

References

911 (English group) songs
1982 singles
1982 songs
1996 debut singles
2005 singles
Liberty X songs
Shalamar songs
SOLAR Records singles
Virgin Records singles